Trachischium is a genus of snakes, known commonly as slender snakes or worm-eating snakes, in the subfamily Natricinae of the family Colubridae. The genus is endemic to Asia.

Geographic range
Species of the genus Trachischium are found through montane regions of the countries of Bangladesh, Bhutan, China, India, and Nepal.

Description
Snakes of the genus Trachischium exhibit the following characters: head not distinct from neck; eye small, with vertically subelliptic pupil; nostril between two small nasals; prefrontals sometimes united; body cylindrical; dorsal scales smooth, in 13 or 15 rows, without apical pits; ventrals rounded; tail short; subcaudals divided; maxillary teeth 18–20, subequal; posterior mandibular teeth shorter than anterior; hypapophyses developed throughout vertebral column.

Species
There are 7 species in the genus Trachischium which are recognized as being valid.
Trachischium apteii 
Trachischium fuscum  – blackbelly worm-eating snake, Darjeeling slender snake
Trachischium guentheri  – Günther's worm-eating snake, rosebelly worm-eating snake
Trachischium laeve  – olive Oriental slender snake
Trachischium monticola  – mountain worm-eating snake
Trachischium sushantai  – Sushanta's worm-eating snake
Trachischium tenuiceps  – yellowbelly worm-eating snake

Nota bene: A binomial authority in parentheses indicates that the species was originally described in a genus other than Trachischium.

References

Further reading
Boulenger GA (1890). The Fauna of British India, Including Ceylon and Burma. Reptilia and Batrachia. London: Secretary of State for India in Council. (Taylor and Francis, printers). xviii + 541 pp. (Genus Trachischium, p. 284).
Günther A (1858). Catalogue of Colubrine Snakes in the Collection of the British Museum. London: Trustees of the British Museum. (Taylor and Francis, printers). xvi + 281 pp. (Trachischium, new genus, p. 30).
Smith MA (1943). The Fauna of British India, Ceylon and Burma, Including the Whole of the Indo-Chinese Sub-region. Reptilia and Amphibia. Vol. III.—Serpentes. London: Secretary of State for India. (Taylor and Francis, printers). xii + 583 pp. (Genus Trachischium, p. 321). 

Trachischium
Snake genera
Taxa named by Albert Günther